Michael A. Viola is an American producer, musician, songwriter, and singer, best known for his work with Panic! at The Disco, Andrew Bird, Ryan Adams, J.S. Ondara, Mandy Moore, and Jenny Lewis. His original music has been featured on soundtracks for movies such as That Thing You Do!, Walk Hard: The Dewey Cox Story, and Get Him to the Greek.

Viola got his start in the mid-1990s as the musical architect for New York-based band Candy Butchers, releasing three critically acclaimed albums with RPM/Sony Records before focusing on music production.

Soundtrack work 
Viola, along with friend Adam Schlesinger of Fountains of Wayne, co-produced the title track for Tom Hanks's 1996 movie That Thing You Do! The selection received an Oscar nomination for Best Original Song. Viola sang lead on the track, and as the accepted singing voice of Johnathon Schaech's character, Jimmy, also sang on other tracks in the film, such as "Little Wild One" and "All My Only Dreams."

For the 2007 Jake Kasdan/Judd Apatow film, Walk Hard: The Dewey Cox Story, Viola wrote or co-wrote "A Life Without You (Is No Life at All)", "Darling", "(I Hate You) Big Daddy", "Dear Mr. President", "Beautiful Ride", "Sir Ringe The Marshmallow Elephant", and "Let Me Hold You Little Man". Viola served as musical director on a promotional tour for the film in December 2007, with John C. Reilly acting out his fictional character of Dewey Cox.

Viola also contributed songwriting for Russell Brand's character Aldous Snow in the 2010 film Get Him to the Greek, including "African Child", "The Clap", "I Am Jesus", "Searching For a Father in America", "Little Bird", "Furry Walls". In 2012, he played the character of Franky in two promotional songs for the video game Club Penguin, "Anchors Aweigh" and "Ghosts Just Wanna Dance".

As songwriter, musician or producer

Discography

References 

1966 births
American singer-songwriters
American rock songwriters
American rock singers
American power pop groups
Living people
Lojinx artists